Wolfgang Rosenfeldt (12 October 1935 – 11 February 2016) is a retired West German football striker.

His 20 Bundesliga appearances and 2 goals came in the 1965–66 SC Tasmania 1900 Berlin season, known as the worst season of any team in the Bundesliga.

References

1935 births
2016 deaths
German footballers
Wacker 04 Berlin players
SC Tasmania 1900 Berlin players
Association football forwards
Bundesliga players